"Befikra" (English: Carefree) is a song recorded by Indian music director duo Meet Bros and Indian singer Aditi Singh Sharma featuring Tiger Shroff and Disha Patani The video has received over 43 Million (43,364,273) views on T-Series official channel of YouTube as of June 20, 2021.

Music video

Synopsis 

The music video shows the lives of two carefree people played by Tiger Shroff and Disha Patani.

Critical reception 
Many praised the chemistry between Tiger and Disha, which led them to be paired again in the action film, Baaghi 2.

References

Hindi songs
2016 singles
Meet Bros songs
2016 songs